Anastasia Pavlyuchenkova and Lucie Šafářová were the defending champions, but lost in the quarterfinals to Anabel Medina Garrigues and Yaroslava Shvedova.
Sara Errani and Roberta Vinci won the title, defeating Garbiñe Muguruza and Carla Suárez Navarro in the final, 6–4, 6–3.

Seeds

Draw

Finals

Top half

Bottom half

References 
Main Draw

Mutua Madrid Open - Women's Doubles
Women's Doubles